The Nera di Arbus, more fully Pecora Nera di Arbus ("black sheep of Arbus"), is a breed of small domestic sheep indigenous to the Mediterranean island of Sardinia, Italy. It takes its name from the comune of Arbus, in the province of Medio Campidano, in the south-western part of the island. It is raised in the provinces of Cagliari, Nuoro, Oristano and Sassari. The breed achieved official recognition in 2008.

The Nera di Arbus is one of the seventeen autochthonous Italian sheep breeds for which a genealogical herdbook is kept by the Associazione Nazionale della Pastorizia, the Italian national association of sheep-breeders.

The milk yield of the Nera di Arbus, over and above that taken by the lambs, averages 50 litres in 100 days for primiparous ewes, and  litres in 180 days for pluriparous ones. The milk averages 6.5% fat and 5.6% protein. Lambs weigh  at 30 days. It is used to make orbace, a coarse hand-woven cloth, from which two traditional Sardinian garments are made: sa mastrucca,  the overcoat worn by shepherds; and su sacu, a heavy waterproof blanket.

References

Sheep breeds originating in Italy